The Inya is a river in Kemerovo and Novosibirsk Oblasts of Russia. It is a right tributary of the Ob.

By the Inya lie the towns of Leninsk-Kuznetsky and Toguchin. The river flows through a rather densely populated area, and is crossed by several railway lines.

Course

Its main tributaries are the Kasma, Ur and Bachat. The river freezes over in the beginning of November, and stays frozen till the spring thaw starts in mid-April.

See also
List of rivers of Russia

References 

 R-ArcticNET - A Regional, Electronic, Hydrographic Data Network For the Arctic Region

Rivers of Kemerovo Oblast
Rivers of Novosibirsk Oblast
Rivers of Novosibirsk